Tan Eng Hoa (1907 – April 1949) was born in Semarang and studied in the HBS. He graduated in law from the Rechts Hogeschool in Batavia in 1932. In 1945, he represented the Chinese Indonesians community in the Japanese-sponsored Investigating Committee for Preparatory Work for Independence, where he proposed an article for the freedom of association in the drafting of the Constitution of Indonesia. He died in April 1949 due to pancreatic cancer.

Early life
Tan was born in Semarang in 1907, to parents who owned a grocery store.

Footnotes

1907 births
1949 deaths
People from Semarang
Indonesian people of Chinese descent